Rik de Voest and Dmitry Tursunov were the defending champions, but chose not to participate that year.
Simon Aspelin and Paul Hanley won in the final 6–2, 6–3, against Lukáš Dlouhý and Leander Paes.

Seeds

Draw

Draws

External links
Doubles Draw

Dubai Tennis Championships - Men's Doubles
2010 Dubai Tennis Championships